Diptychus is a genus of cyprinid freshwater fish, consisting of two species found in Himalaya and the Tibetan Plateau of China, India, Nepal and Pakistan, ranging west to the Tien Shan Mountains and Central Asia. The type species is the scaly osman, Diptychus maculatus. The name is derived from the Greek word di, meaning "two", and the Greek word , meaning "fold".

Diptychus is a part of the schizothoracines (snowtrout and allies), which also includes the genera Aspiorhynchus, Chuanchia, Gymnodiptychus, Gymnocypris, Oxygymnocypris, Platypharodon, Ptychobarbus, Schizopyge, Schizopygopsis and Schizothorax.

Species
There are two recognized species in this genus:

 Diptychus maculatus Steindachner, 1866 (Scaly osman)
 Diptychus sewerzowi Kessler, 1872

References

 
Cyprinidae genera
Cyprinid fish of Asia